Jamie Pace MacDonald (born 1 January 1977) is a retired professional footballer who played as a midfielder. Born in England, he represented the Malta national team at international level.

Club career
Pace joined Marsaxlokk in 2005 from Valletta, during his time in Malta he has also played for Sliema Wanderers and Pietà Hotspurs. He played with various clubs in London before coming to Malta including 1997–98 with Barton Rovers making 51 appearances and scoring 21 goals, Tooting & Mitcham during 1999–2001. Pace had his first trial with Crystal Palace at the age of 17.

International career
Pace had a three-way option of which nation he wished to play his international football for. He could have chosen England, his country of birth, through his Maltese mother Maria-Teresa Pace or Jamaica through his father (the late Keith McDonald), who played for Chelsea. Jamie is the first cousin of ex under-21 Malta international and Marsaxlokk left back Andrew Spiteri.

Pace decided to declare his nationality to Malta after he settled in Malta and learnt the language. In 2005, he received a call up to join the Malta national team, and made his debut on 9 February 2005 against Norway.

Career statistics
Scores and results list Malta's goal tally first, score column indicates score after each Pace goal.

Honours
Marsaxlokk
 Maltese Premier League: 2006–07

Valletta
 Maltese Premier League: 2010–11

External links
 
 
 

1977 births
Living people
Footballers from Hammersmith
People with acquired Maltese citizenship
Maltese footballers
Malta international footballers
English footballers
English people of Maltese descent
English sportspeople of Jamaican descent
Maltese people of Jamaican descent
Sportspeople of Jamaican descent
Carshalton Athletic F.C. players
Pietà Hotspurs F.C. players
Sliema Wanderers F.C. players
Marsaxlokk F.C. players
Valletta F.C. players
Maltese expatriate footballers
Black British sportspeople
Tooting & Mitcham United F.C. players
Sutton United F.C. players
Barton Rovers F.C. players
Association football midfielders